Cristina is a female given name.

Cristina may also refer to:

 Cristina (daughter of Edward the Exile), 11th-century English princess
 Cristina (singer) (1956–2020), American singer

 Cristina, Badajoz, Spain, a municipality
 Cristina, Minas Gerais, Brazil, a municipality
 Cristina (film), a 1946 Argentine film
 Cristina (TV series), a 1989 Italian series
 Cristina (harvestman), a genus of harvestmen

See also 
 Christina (disambiguation)
 Kristina (disambiguation)
 Santa Cristina (disambiguation)